The 2010-11 Malaysia Hockey League kicked off on 3 December 2010 and concluded on 19 March 2011.

Teams
Nine teams competed in the Premier Division, an increase of three teams from the previous year, while seven teams competed in Division One. 

  Tenaga Nasional Berhad HC
  Sapura HC
  Maybank HC
  UniKL-TRC HC
  KL Hockey Club (formerly known as Ernst & Young HC)
  Nur Insafi HC
  Armed Forces-Airod HC
  UiTM HC
  Yayasan Negeri Sembilan HC

Results

Premier

Division 1

First to eighth place classification

References

Malaysia Hockey League
2010 in field hockey
2011 in field hockey
2010 in Malaysian sport
2011 in Malaysian sport